The men's kumite 65 kilograms competition at the 2006 Asian Games in Doha, Qatar was held on 13 December 2006 at the Qatar SC Indoor Hall.

Schedule
All times are Arabia Standard Time (UTC+03:00)

Results
Legend
K — Won by kiken (8–0)

Main bracket

Final

Top half

Bottom half

Repechage

References
Results

External links
Official website

Men's kumite 65 kg